Yalpuh is a freshwater lake located in the southern Ukrainian oblast of Odessa. The largest natural lake in Ukraine, it covers an area of 149 km², has an average depth of about two metres, a maximum depth of 5.5 metres and, at its southernmost point, adjoins Lake Kugurluy.

Its northern shores are in the Bolhrad Raion. It borders the Reni Raion to its southwest and the Izmail Raion to its southeast.

The largest town on Yalpuh's shores is Bolhrad at its northernmost point.  Larger villages include Vynohradivka to the north, Kotlovyna to the west and Ozerne on its southeastern shore.

References 

Landforms of Odesa Oblast
Yalpuh
Danube Delta